Samuel Aguilar Alvarenga (March 16, 1933 – May 12, 2013) was a Paraguayan football goalkeeper who played for Paraguay in the 1958 FIFA World Cup. He also played for Club Libertad.

References

External links

1933 births
2013 deaths
Paraguayan footballers
Paraguayan expatriate footballers
Paraguay international footballers
1958 FIFA World Cup players
Association football goalkeepers
Categoría Primera A players
Club Libertad footballers
Club Olimpia footballers
Deportivo Pereira footballers
Expatriate footballers in Colombia
Paraguayan expatriate sportspeople in Colombia